Kawlata is a traditional Maltese vegetable soup. It is typically made with cabbage and pork, and consumed during the winter months.

The first Maltese newspaper was called Il-kawlata maltija ("Maltese Medley").
During World War II, Kawlata was a food staple prepared by the Communal Feeding Kitchens.

See also

 List of soups

References

Maltese cuisine
Soups